Global Underground 011: Nick Warren, Budapest is a DJ mix album in the Global Underground series, compiled and mixed by Nick Warren. The mix is a retrospective look at a 4-hour set at the Korona club in Kecel, Hungary.

Nick’s third GU mix is a masterclass in techy trance. Hungary is exactly the sort of emerging clubbing scene that the series has done so well at bringing into the consciousness of the sometimes jaded, rather spoilt dance fans of Western Europe.

GU011 provides a taste of the kind of records (and the mixing behind them) that these wild post-communist clubbers were screaming down the walls for every weekend. The energy and enthusiasm of club scenes like Budapest’s are now well documented. But in the late 90s, and without a budget flights culture, it was only really the tales from travelling DJs like Nick that hinted at what was going on. Then came this CD, where you can almost feel the charged atmosphere as glorious crisp and deep electronica provides the ideal shared soundtrack to an ongoing celebration of freedom.

Track listing

Disc one
 Mara - "One (Hamel Remix)" – 8:35
 Timo Maas vs Ian Wilkie - "Twin Town (Nick Warren Mix)" – 5:03
 Phaser - "Driven" – 4:06
 Danny Tenaglia - "Turn Me On (Bedrock Mix)" – 6:34
 Sandra Collins - "Flutterby" – 4:48
 Stef - "Steffan" – 4:33
 Thee Phonk vs C-Rocket - "Blagger" – 3:18
 Funk Function - "Empress III" – 4:54
 Armin - "Virgo" – 4:26
 HH - "Ice 897" – 4:26
 Origin - "Yellow" – 6:51
 Novocaine - "Rainmaker" – 5:51
 Arcadium - "Fade Instinct" – 7:53

Disc two
 Purple Haze - "Genetic" – 9:10
 Revolt - "Faster Faster" – 3:12
 LSG - "Shecan" – 5:41
 Classified Project - "Phenomenon" – 4:16
 Breeder - "Beetlejuice" – 7:01
 Z Two - "I Want You" – 7:43
 Life on Mars - "Life in Minds (Evolution Mix)" – 6:44
 The Universe - "Nuclear Hyde" – 5:23
 Tilt - "What's This?" – 5:54
 Sphere - "Gravity" – 7:17
 Mara - "Lateral Horizon" – 7:46
 The Forth - "Secret Silence" – 1:49

References

External links 

Global Underground
1999 compilation albums
DJ mix albums